Châteaugiron (Gallo: Chaujon) is a commune in the Ille-et-Vilaine department of Brittany in northwestern France. It extended on 1 January 2017 by merging with the former communes of Saint-Aubin-du-Pavail and Ossé.

Population
Inhabitants of Châteaugiron are called Castelgironnais and Castelgironnaises in French.

Sister cities
 Puszczykowo, Poland

Gallery

See also
Communes of the Ille-et-Vilaine department

References

External links

Official website 

Mayors of Ille-et-Vilaine Association 

Communes of Ille-et-Vilaine

Communes nouvelles of Ille-et-Vilaine